Heated humidified high-flow  (HHHF) therapy, often also high flow nasal cannula(e) (HFNC) or high flow nasal oxygen (HFNO), is a type of respiratory support method that delivers a high flow (liters per minute) of medical gas to a patient through an interface (nasal cannulae) intended to create a wash-out of the upper airway.  The applied gas is heated to best match human body temperature (37 °C) and humidified targeting ideal body saturation vapor pressure. It is used in acute and chronic breathing problems, and is a suitable choice for treatment of patients with severe or critical COVID-19.

A relevant parameter is the fraction of inspired oxygen (FiO2).

Medical uses 
High-flow therapy is useful in patients that are spontaneously breathing but have an increased work of breathing.  Conditions such as general respiratory failure, asthma exacerbation, COPD exacerbation, bronchiolitis, pneumonia, and congestive heart failure are all possible situations where high-flow therapy may be indicated. HHHF has been used in spontaneously breathing patients with during general anaesthesia to facilitate surgery for airway obstruction.

Newborn babies
High-flow therapy has shown to be useful in neonatal intensive care settings for premature infants with Infant respiratory distress syndrome, as it prevents many infants from needing artificial ventilation via intubation, and allows safe respiratory management at lower FiO2 levels, and thus reduces the risk of retinopathy of prematurity and oxygen toxicity.

Due to the decreased stress of effort needed to breathe, the neonatal body is able to spend more time utilizing metabolic efforts elsewhere, which causes decreased days on a mechanical ventilator, faster weight gain, and overall decreased hospital stay entirely.

High flow therapy has been successfully implemented in infants and older children. The cannula improves the respiratory distress, the oxygen saturation, and the patient's comfort. Its mechanism of action is the application of mild positive airway pressure and lung volume recruitment.

Benefits 
HFT, the clinician can deliver higher FiO2 to the patient than is possible with typical oxygen delivery therapy without the use of a non-rebreather mask or tracheal intubation.  Heated humidification of the respiratory gas facilitates secretion clearance and decreases the development of bronchial hyper-response symptoms. Some patients requiring respiratory support for bronchospasm benefit using air delivered by HFT without additional oxygen. HFT is useful in the treatment of sleep apnea.  During use of HFT the patient can speak. As this is a non-invasive therapy, it avoids the risk of ventilator-associated pneumonia in situations where it can supplant the use of a ventilator.

Use of nasal high flow in acute hypoxemic respiratory failure does not affect mortality or length of stay either in hospital or in the intensive care unit. It does however reduce the need for tracheal intubation (by 15%) and escalation of oxygenation and respiratory support. However, the certainty that this result is reliable is low, as different studies were less precise than they could have been. People on nasal high flow feel more comfortable, less breathless, and there was little evidence of harm.

Mechanism
Oxygenation is achieved by providing an increased FiO2 in the air flow to the patient.  The constant flush of the upper airway creates a reservoir that reduces room-air entrainment to such an amount that it becomes a true fraction of inspired oxygen as set by the device.

Ventilation 
Through a nasal cannula a high-flow system delivers flows that approach (and can meet) total respiratory demand.  This flow, being delivered though a small diameter delivery system and small-bore nasal cannula allows the flow that would traditionally move slowly through the upper airway to move quickly and maintain a constant stream of fresh gas which effectively washes out upper airway dead space.

This constant stream of fresh gas flow creates an environment that assists exhalation effort by flushing the exhaled air out to maintain this reservoir of fresh air ready to be inhaled.

Humidification
The higher the flow, the more important proper humidification and conditioning of the flow becomes.  Without humidity, the oxygenation and ventilation effects of high-flow therapy would be quickly overcome by the negative impact that dry air has on lung tissue.

History 
Nasal cannulae used for medical gas delivery are usually limited to delivery of 1–6 liters of flow per minute. The percent oxygen inhaled by the patient (FiO2), usually ranges roughly 24–35% as the pure oxygen delivered from the cannula is diluted by entrainment of ambient air (21% oxygen). Flow rates for delivery of oxygen using typical nasal cannula are limited because medical oxygen is anhydrous, and when delivered from a pressurized source the gas cools as it expands with the drop to atmospheric pressure.  Delivery of cold dry gas is irritating to the respiratory mucosa, can cause drying and bleeding of the nasal mucosa and can increase metabolic demand by cooling the body.

Even with quiet breathing, the inspiratory flow rate at the nares of an adult usually exceeds 12 liters per minute, and can exceed 30 liters a minute for someone with mild respiratory distress.  Traditional oxygen therapy is limited to six liters per minute, does not begin to approach the inspiratory demand of an adult, and therefore the oxygen is diluted with room air during inspiration.

Prior to the advent of HFT, when increased FiO2 was required for respiratory support; special face masks or intubation was required.  With High Flow Therapy, the goal is to deliver a respiratory gas flow volume sufficient to meet or exceed the patient's inspiratory flow rate.  The gas is heated and humidified to condition the gas as increased flows would be detrimental to tissue if left dry and cool.

HFT, a source of oxygen is usually blended with compressed air. Hospitals usually have  compressed oxygen and air available for therapeutic use. This allows the delivery of air or blends of air and oxygen with the use of an oxygen blender.  The gas is then heated, generally to about 37 °C, and humidified to near 100% RH using a humidifier. The gas is transported to the patient through a heated delivery tube to prevent cooling and condensation of the water vapor that has been added to the respiratory gas(es).

HFT requires the use of nasal cannulae and a system designed to deliver high flow rates and the pressure generated to do so. At the same time the nasal cannula must be small enough that they do not occlude more than 50% of the nares, as this allows flow to have multiple points of exit for a continuous airway flush effect.

Commercial developments 
Vapotherm introduced the concept of heated humidified high flow therapy via nasal cannula in 1999 after being originally developed for use in race horses.

References

Medical equipment
Respiratory therapy
Mechanical ventilation